Events from the year 1614 in Ireland.

Incumbent
Monarch: James I

Events
April 2 – James I rebukes a deputation from the Catholic opposition in the Parliament of Ireland.
June 22 – the Synod of Kilkenny regulates discipline and practice in the Catholic Province of Dublin.
 The Irish Parliament passed the Highways Act which required local parishes to maintain roads within their boundaries serving market towns.

Arts and literature
Dermod O'Meara produces the first book of Latin verse published in Ireland, Ormonius.

Births
July 10 – Arthur Annesley, 1st Earl of Anglesey, royal statesman (d. 1686)

Deaths
June 17 – William Bathe, Jesuit priest and linguist (b. 1564)
November 15 – Giolla Brighde Ó hEoghusa (Bonaventura Ó hEoghusa or O'Hussey), poet and priest.
November 22 – Thomas Butler, 10th Earl of Ormonde, Lord Treasurer of Ireland (b. c. 1513)

References

 
1610s in Ireland
Ireland
Years of the 17th century in Ireland